Renfrew is a town in Scotland.

Renfrew may also refer to:

Places

Canada
 Renfrew, Calgary, a neighbourhood in Alberta
 Renfrew, Nova Scotia
 Renfrew, Ontario
 Renfrew County, Ontario
 Renfrew station, a Skytrain station in Vancouver
 Renfrew-Collingwood, a neighborhood in Vancouver, British Columbia
 Port Renfrew, British Columbia, Vancouver Island

Scotland
Renfrew (district), a former district of Strathclyde
Renfrewshire, the council area in which Renfrew is situated
Renfrewshire (historic), an historic county of Scotland

United States
 Renfrew, Pennsylvania

People with the surname
 Catherine Easton Renfrew (died 2002), British speech therapist
 Charles Byron Renfrew (1928–2017), American judge
 Colin Renfrew (born 1937), Baron Renfrew of Kaimsthorn, British archeologist
 Malcolm Renfrew (1910–2013), American polymer chemist, inventor, and professor
 Mary Renfrew (born 1955), British professor of midwifery
 Stewart Renfrew, Scottish footballer

Other uses
 Renfrew of the Royal Mounted, a fictional Canadian law-enforcement officer in radio and print stories
 Holt Renfrew, a Canadian luxury goods retailer

See also
 Baron Renfrew (disambiguation)